The National Centre for Excellence in the Teaching of Mathematics (NCETM) is an institution set up in the wake of the Smith Report to improve mathematics teaching in England.

It provides strategic leadership for mathematics-specific CPD and aims to raise the professional status of all those engaged in the teaching of mathematics so that the mathematical potential of learners will be fully realised.

Structure
Its Director until March 2013 was Dame Celia Hoyles, Professor of Mathematics Education at the Institute of Education, University of London and former chief adviser on mathematics education for the government. She was succeeded by the current Director, Charlie Stripp.

An innovative NCETM development is the MatheMaPedia project, masterminded by John Mason, which is a "maths teaching wiki".

Initially headquartered in London, it is headquartered in the south of Sheffield city centre; it is the headquarters of Tribal Education.

It is run by Mathematics in Education and Industry (MEI) and Tribal Education.

Online discussions
Special online events have included the world’s first online discussion of proof.

See also
 Centre for Industry Education Collaboration and National Centre for Computing Education, also at York
 Count On - maths education initiative
 Mathematics education in the United Kingdom
 International Congress on Mathematical Education

References

Department for Education
Education in Sheffield
Educational organisations based in the United Kingdom
Mathematics education in the United Kingdom
Mathematics education reform
Mathematics organizations
Mathematics websites
Organisations based in Sheffield
Organizations established in 1996